Francis Gusts (born 2 January 2003) is an international speedway rider from Latvia.

Speedway career 
Gusts became the European Junior Champion after winning the 2021 Individual Speedway Junior European Championship in his home country.

In 2021, Gusts helped Latvia qualify for the final of the 2021 Speedway of Nations (the World team Championships of speedway). He competed in the 2021 Individual Speedway Junior World Championship 

In 2022, he finished in 10th place during the World Under-21 Championship in the 2022 SGP2 and helped PSŻ Poznań win the 2022 2.Liga.

References 

Living people
2003 births
Latvian speedway riders